Meers may refer to:

People
 Ernest George Meers (1848–1928), English tennis player
 Nelson Meers (born 1938), Australian lawyer and Lord Mayor of Sydney
 Nick Meers (born 1955), English photographer
 William Meers (1844–1902), English cricketer

Other uses
 Meers, Oklahoma, U.S.
 Meers Brook, a stream in Sheffield, England
 Meers Fault, a fault in Oklahoma, U.S.
 Fuddy Meers, an American play by David Lindsay-Abaire

See also 
 Meer (disambiguation)